James Pickands III (September 4, 1931 – March 9, 2022) was an American mathematical statistician known for his contribution to extreme value theory and stochastic processes.

Pickands was born in Euclid, Ohio. He studied at Taft University and Yale University, where he obtained his bachelor's degree. He then moved to Columbia University, where he received his PhD under Simeon Berman in 1965. While at Columbia, Pickands also worked with Emil Gumbel, and developed interests in extreme value theory.

Pickands served in the US Army in Aberdeen, Maryland after graduating from Columbia university. He briefly taught at Virginia Tech as an assistant professor before joining the Wharton School at the University of Pennsylvania in 1969 as an associate professor, where he stayed for the rest of his career.

Bibliography 
 
 
 
 
 
 
 Pickands, James (1981). "Multivariate extreme value distribution." Proceedings 43th, Session of International Statistical Institution, 859–878.

See also 
 Pickands–Balkema–De Haan theorem

References 

1931 births
2022 deaths
People from Euclid, Ohio
Yale University alumni
Columbia University alumni
Virginia Tech faculty
Wharton School of the University of Pennsylvania faculty
Mathematical statisticians